Joseph Hirsch (Tzvi) Carlebach  (January 30, 1883, Lübeck, German Empire – March 26, 1942, Biķerniecki forest, near Riga, Latvia) was an Orthodox rabbi and Jewish-German scholar and natural scientist (Naturwissenschaftler).

Early life and family 

Carlebach was the eighth child of Esther Adler (1853–1920), daughter of the former rabbi of Lübeck, Rabbi Alexander Sussmann Adler (1816–1869), and Lübeck's then-Rabbi Salomon Carlebach (1845–1919). 

In 1919, Joseph Carlebach and his former pupil Charlotte Preuss (1900–1942) married. They had nine children. One of them is rabbi Shlomo Carlebach.

Education and early career 
Joseph Carlebach became a rabbi, as did several of his brothers, to wit David Carlebach, Emanuel Carlebach (rabbi in Memel and Cologne), Hartwig Naftali Carlebach (rabbi in Berlin, Baden near Vienna and New York), and Ephraim Carlebach (rabbi in Leipzig). Initially, however, Joseph Carlebach completed extensive studies in natural sciences. From 1901 on he studied at Friedrich-Wilhelms-Universität in Berlin natural sciences, mathematics, astronomy, philosophy and history of art. The quantum physicist Max Planck and the philosopher Wilhelm Dilthey (hermeneutics) were among his teachers. In 1908 he graduated as high-school teacher (Oberlehrer-Examen) of natural sciences (at summa cum laude). In the same time Carlebach attended the orthodox Rabbinical Seminary in Berlin. In 1905 to 1907 Carlebach interrupted his studies in Germany and taught at the Lämel-School in Jerusalem. There Carlebach made the acquaintance of a number of eminent rabbis.

In 1909 Carlebach obtained degrees in mathematics, physics and Hebrew at Ruprecht-Karls-Universität in Heidelberg. There he also was awarded his doctorate on the mathematician Levi ben Gershon (Lewi ben Gerson als Mathematiker). Carlebach gained an academic reputation by books on Levi ben Gershon as well as on Albert Einstein's relativity theory in 1912. From 1910 to 1914 Carlebach enrolled in the rabbinical seminary under Rabbi David Zvi Hoffmann, receiving his semikhah (rabbinic ordination) in 1914.

World War I service 

During World War I Carlebach served in the imperial German Army, at the beginning as telegraphist. In 1915 he was assigned as educator - after recommendation by his brother-in-law Leopold Rosenak, a German Army Field Rabbi active in promoting German culture among the Jews of Lithuania and Poland during the German occupation (1915–1918). 

Erich Ludendorff's intention was to evoke pro-German attitudes among Jews and other Poles and Lithuanians, in order to prepare the installation of a Polish and a Lithuanian state dependent on Germany. Part of the effort was the establishment of Jewish newspapers (e.g. the folkist Warszawer Togblat, וואַרשעווער טאָגבלאַט), of Jewish organisations (e.g. Joseph's brother German Army Field Rabbi Emanuel Carlebach (1874-1927) initiated in Łomża the foundation of the hassidic umbrella organisation Agudas Yisroel of Poland, part of a non-Zionist movement founded in Germany in 1912) and of modern educational institutions of Jewish alignment. Joseph Carlebach founded the partly German-language Jüdisches Realgymnasium גימנזיום עברי (academic high school) in Kaunas (Kovno; the interwar capital of Lithuania) and directed it until 1919. The school was based on the German Torah im Derech Eretz model. The school provided both Jewish and secular studies both for men and women (separately) and was the model for the Yavneh network that Carlebach later founded in collaboration with Leo Deutschlander. In 1925, Yavneh was taken over by Joseph Leib Bloch (1860-1930), who relocated it to Telšiai (Russ.: Telshe, Yidd.: Telz טעלז) and incorporated it into the Rabbinical College of Telshe, which managed to re-establish in 1942 in the USA. 

From 1919 to 1921 he was rabbi of his native home town Lübeck. In 1921, Carlebach became headmaster of the Talmud Torah high school in Hamburg. Between 1925 and 1936 he served as chief rabbi of the Hochdeutsche Israeliten-Gemeinde zu Altona, after which he changed as chief rabbi to the Deutsch-Israelitische Gemeinde zu Hamburg, where he served until his deportation into death in 1941. Israeli jurist Haim Cohn described the effect Carlebach had on his students (as well as illustrating Carlebach's fairly unusual position that Orthodox Jews may visit churches): 
He spent a full day with the boys in the Cologne Cathedral, expertly explaining every detail of the statues, the glass windows, the ornaments, and the intricacies of the Catholic faith and ritual; but I was not allowed to participate, being a Cohen who may not be under the same roof with a corpse or with tombs, lest he become impure; and although, according to the letter of the Law, it is only the Jewish dead the contact with whom renders impure, and not the non-Jewish dead, still Carlebach held that the least possibility that among the dead buried in the cathedral may have been a person of Jewish origin (even though ultimately converted to Christianity), sufficed to make the place taboo to me.

Persecution and murder under the Nazi regime 

After Nazi Germany banned Jewish students from attending German schools together with "Aryan" German children, Rabbi Carlebach set up a number of schools throughout Germany to educate Jewish children. His schools bore his name and were known as Carlebach-Schulen.

He was deported to the Nazi concentration camp Jungfernhof by the Nazis, where he was murdered on March 26, 1942 during the mass shooting of approximately 1600 Jews, mostly older people and children, that became known as the Dünamünde Action.  This occurred in the Biķerniecki forest, near Riga, Latvia, which was the site of numerous other shootings perpetrated by the Nazis and their Latvian collaborators, in particular, the Arajs Kommando.

His wife and younger children were also killed during the Holocaust. Of his surviving children, Rabbi Shlomo Carlebach became the mashgiach ruchani ("spiritual supervisor" [of students]) at the Yeshiva Rabbi Chaim Berlin in Brooklyn, New York City after the war, and his third daughter became Professor Miriam Gillis-Carlebach, who emigrated to Israel in October 1938. She taught Education and Hebrew reading at Bar-Ilan University, in Ramat Gan. In 1992, she became the head of the Joseph Carlebach Institute at Bar-Ilan University and has dedicated herself to researching her father's writings as well as the writing of other Jewish leaders of the same time period.

Rabbi Joseph Carlebach's wife managed to send her elder children to England, and they survived the war.

Commemoration and legacy 

On 18 August 1954 Jerusalem honoured Carlebach's work, among others at the local Lämel-School, by naming a street, Rekhov Carlebach/Karlibakh רחוב קרליבך, after him in the neighbourhood of Talpiot.

The memory of Joseph Carlebach is held in great honor by the City of Hamburg and its Jewish community. In 1990, part of the University Campus, the Bornplatz, the former location of the Main Synagogue of Hamburg and Carlebach's last pulpit, was named as the "Joseph-Carlebach-Platz". In honor of his 120th Birthday in 2003, the "Joseph-Carlebach-Preis" (Joseph Carlebach prize) for Jewish studies was established, awarded every two years, by the State University of Hamburg.

Works
Carlebach, Joseph. Die drei grossen Propheten Jesajas, Jirmija und Jecheskel; eine Studie. Pp. 133. Frankfurt am Main: Hermon-Verlag, 1932
Carlebach, Joseph. Les trois grands prophetes, Isaie, Jeremie, Ezechiel. Traduit de l'allemand par Henri Schilli. Pp. 141. Paris: Editions A. Michel, 1959
Carlebach, Joseph. Moderne paedagogische Bestrebungen und ihre Beziehungen zum Judentum. Pp. 19. Berlin, Hebraeischer Verlag "Menorah", 1925
Carlebach, Joseph. Mikhtavim mi-Yerushalayim (1905–1906): Erets Yi'sra'el be-reshit ha-me'ah be-`ene moreh tsa`ir, ma'skil-dati mi-Germanyah. (Ed. and transl. Miryam Gilis-Karlibakh). Pp. 141, ill. Ramat-Gan: Orah, mi-pirsume Mekhon Yosef Karlibakh; Yerushalayim: Ariel, c1996
Carlebach, Joseph. Ausgewaehlte Schriften mit einem Vorwort von Haim H. Cohn; herausgegeben von Miriam Gillis-Carlebach. 2 vols. Hildesheim; New York: G. Olms Verlag, 1982
Carlebach, Joseph. Lewi ben Gerson als Mathematiker; ein Beitrag zur Geschichte der Mathematik bei den Juden. Von Dr. phil. 238, [2]. Berlin: L. Lamm, 1910
Carlebach, Joseph. Das gesetzestreue Judentum. Pp. 53. Berlin: Im Schocken Verlag, 1936.
Carlebach, Joseph. Juedischer Alltag als humaner Widerstand: Dokumente des Hamburger Oberrabiners Dr. Joseph Carlebach aus den Jahren 1939-1942. Ed. Miriam Gillis-Carlebach. Pp. 118, ill. Hamburg: Verlag Verein fuer Hamburgische Geschichte, 1990
Gerhard Paul; Miriam Gillis-Carlebach (Eds.). Menora und Hakenkreuz: zur Geschichte der Juden in und aus Schleswig-Holstein, Luebeck und Altona (1918–1998). Pp. 943, ill. Neumuenster: Wachholtz Verlag, 1998

Notes

External links

 Joseph Carlebach Institute
 Personality of the Week - Carlebach at www.bh.org.il
Review of the book: Ish Yehudi: The Life and the Legacy of a Torah Great, Rav Joseph Tzvi Carebach

Joseph
1883 births
1942 deaths
Scientists from Lübeck
German Orthodox rabbis
German Army personnel of World War I
German Jews who died in the Holocaust
Jewish military personnel 
People who died in Jungfernhof concentration camp
The Holocaust in Latvia
German civilians killed in World War II
People from Schleswig-Holstein executed in Nazi concentration camps
Jewish scientists
Hildesheimer Rabbinical Seminary alumni
Clergy from Lübeck